Philip Morris (born 15 May 1952) is a New Zealand former cricketer. He played eleven first-class matches for Otago between 1975 and 1977.

See also
 List of Otago representative cricketers

References

External links
 

1952 births
Living people
New Zealand cricketers
Otago cricketers
Cricketers from Dunedin